The Lincoln Journal Star is an American daily newspaper that serves Lincoln, Nebraska, the state capital and home of the University of Nebraska. It is the most widely read newspaper in Lincoln and has the second-largest circulation in Nebraska (after the Omaha World-Herald). The paper also operates a commercial printing unit.

History
The Lincoln Journal Star is the result of a 1995 merger between the city's two historic newspapers. The Lincoln Star, established in 1905, was Lincoln's morning newspaper while the Lincoln Journal was distributed in the evenings. The Journal was itself the conglomeration of several previous Lincoln newspapers.

The Lincoln Journal 
On September 7, 1867, Charles Henry Gere founded the Nebraska Commonwealth. A member of the prominent Gere family, Gere was a New York native and Civil War veteran. As an attorney who had studied law in Baltimore, Gere quickly became an important figure in Nebraska, serving as the private secretary of the state's first governor. Gere spearheaded numerous local issues, specifically favoring the idea that all state government functions should be housed in one city as opposed to scattering them across the state. As such, Gere became an important voice in the nascent state capital, Lincoln, and the Nebraska Commonwealth became its first newspaper.

In 1869, two years after moving the Commonwealth to Lincoln, Gere changed the name of the publication to the Nebraska State Journal. The following year, the newspaper became a daily. As his publication grew, Gere retired from law to become an active part of his newspaper. Having served in the first governor's administration, the state constitutional convention, the state senate, the education commission, the committee on railroads, and the University of Nebraska Board of Regents, Gere's long history of involvement in local politics and strongly-held views impacted the editorial tone of the paper. In one editorial in 1890, Gere famously likened the Farmer's Alliance and its candidates to "a herd of hogs", criticizing the party for disrupting Republican party politics in the state.

In 1897, J.C. Seacrest, a former reporter for the Nebraska State Journal, purchased the Lincoln Evening News, which was published by the State Journal as an evening edition. By 1922, Seacrest had changed the name of the Lincoln Evening News to the Lincoln Evening Journal and become the majority owner of the State Journal Company. Seacrest merged the two publications to create to create the Lincoln Evening Journal & Nebraska State Journal.

The Lincoln Star 
In 1902, Lincoln utilities tycoon and millionaire D.E. Thompson established the Lincoln Daily Star. In 1910, Thompson sold the Daily Star to local grain operator Herbert E. Gooch. The Great Depression caused Gooch to sell the publication to the Lee Group of Davenport, Iowa, now Lee Enterprises, for one million dollars in 1930. As the Depression wore on, financial circumstances forced the Seacrests and Lee Group to buy minority interest in each other's companies in 1931 to stay afloat. However, the two publications remained independent and controlled their own content.

Merger 
The two papers had held minority stakes in each other since 1931. In 1937, J.C. Seacrest created a trust which ensured that the Journal would remain in the possession of the Seacrest family throughout the lifetimes of his sons, Joe W. and Fred S. Seacrest, and their children. Joe W. and Fred inherited the Journal upon their father's death in 1942. 

However, financial realities forced greater cooperation between the Journal and Star and in 1950, the State Journal Printing Company and Star Printing Company merged into the Journal-Star Printing Company. Despite being printed by the same company and sharing offices and production facilities, the publications maintained competing news teams and ran separate stories. In 1971, Joe W. Seacrest chose his son Joe R. Seacrest and his nephew Mark Seacrest to run the Journal. In 1990, the two papers began running combined weekend and holiday editions.

By 1995, it was obvious that Lincoln could no longer support two separate newspapers. That March, Lee Enterprises bought the Journal from the Seacrest family, and merged it with the Star. The final separate editions of the Journal and Star were published on August 4, 1995; the first edition of the merged Lincoln Journal Star rolled off the presses on August 7.

Awards and alumni 
 In 1949, the Nebraska State Journal was awarded the Pulitzer Prize for Public Service "for the campaign establishing the "Nebraska All-Star Primary" presidential preference primary which spotlighted, through a bi-partisan committee, issues early in the presidential campaign."
 Mari Sandoz served as proofreader for the Nebraska State Journal.
 Willa Cather wrote for the Nebraska State Journal from 1893 to 1899 as the fine arts critic.

References

External links

 

1867 establishments in Nebraska
1995 establishments in Nebraska
Daily newspapers published in the United States
Lee Enterprises publications
Mass media in Lincoln, Nebraska
Newspapers published in Nebraska
Newspapers established in 1867
Publications established in 1995
Pulitzer Prize for Public Service winners
Pulitzer Prize-winning newspapers